Kottapadi is a village near Guruvayur town in the district of Thrissur, Kerala, South India. Kottapadi literally translates to Gates to Fort. Kottapadi has now gained prominence Punnathurkotta for which it has been named, which used to house elephants belonging to the Guruvayoor temple. (Anakotta in Malayalam, literally translated as "Elephant Fort") Elephants that are an integral part of certain temple rituals are boarded and trained here.

History
Kottapadi being a coastal village (6 km from sea) like many other parts of Kerala has white sand and  Coconut farming was a major industry and still one can see large swaths of lands with Coconut palms. Due to rapid urbanization of the Guruvayur area, most of this village has now become a small town. Kottapadi is located only 2 kilometers away from Guruvayur temple. Many tourists come here for visiting the Punnathur Kotta. There are more than 60 elephants here.  These elephants belong to the Guruvayur Temple, where prominent devotees offer it to Lord Guruvayurappan. Earlier this place was the palace (Punnathur Kotta or Punathur Fort) of a local ruler. Prominent Shiva temple at Mammiyur is located close by.

Nearest Airport: Cochin International Airport

Nearest Railway Stations: Guruvayur, Trichur

Nearest Major Towns: Guruvayur, Chavakkad, Kunnamkulam

Colleges in Kottapadi
Little Flower women's college, Aryabhatta women's college, Mercy college.

Temples in Kottapadi
 Chembalakulangara Bhagavathi kshethram, 
 Sree Subramanya Kshethram, 
 Kaveed Karthyani Kshetram,
 Sree Kapaleshwaram Shiva temple.

References

Villages in Thrissur district
Guruvayur